Paris is a British sitcom produced by Talkback Productions for  Channel 4. It was written jointly by Irish writers Arthur Mathews and Graham Linehan, best known for their later sitcom Father Ted. The show only lasted one series consisting of six episodes in October and November 1994. It featured the escapades of French artist Alain Degout, living in 1920s Paris, who wants to be famous, but his work gets him nowhere.

Cast
Alexei Sayle as Alain Degout
Neil Morrissey as Rochet
Allan Corduner as Minotti
James Dreyfus as Belunaire
Simon Godley as Pilo
Beverley Klein as Mme Ovary
Walter Sparrow as Hugo

Episodes

External links
 
 

1990s British sitcoms
1994 British television series debuts
1994 British television series endings
Channel 4 sitcoms
English-language television shows
Television series set in the 1920s
Television shows set in Paris
Television series by Fremantle (company)